Michael Hecht is a communications professor at Penn State University.

Michael Hecht may also refer to:
Michael Howard or Michael Hecht (born 1941), British politician 
Michael H. Hecht (fl. 1980s–2020s), American astronomer and physicist
Michael Hecht (footballer) (born 1965), German footballer
Michael Leonard Hecht (born 1970), American economic developer